San Juan is a corregimiento in Colón District, Colón Province, Panama with a population of 17,430 as of 2010. Its population as of 1990 was 8,716; its population as of 2000 was 13,325.

References

Corregimientos of Colón Province